Newport most commonly refers to:

Newport, Wales
Newport, Rhode Island, US

Newport or New Port may also refer to:

Places

Asia 
Newport City, Metro Manila, a Philippine district in Pasay

Europe

Ireland
Newport, County Mayo, a town on the island's west coast
Newport, County Tipperary, an inland town on Newport river

United Kingdom

England 
Newport, Cornwall
Newport (Cornwall) (UK Parliament constituency)
Newport, Devon, in Barnstaple
Newport, East Riding of Yorkshire
Newport, Essex
Newport, Gloucestershire
Newport, Isle of Wight
Newport (Isle of Wight) (UK Parliament constituency)
Newport and Carisbrooke, a civil parish formerly called just "Newport"
Newport, Shropshire
Newport Rural District
Newport (Shropshire) (UK Parliament constituency)
Newport, Somerset, a hamlet in the parish of North Curry
Newport, Dorset, in Bloxworth
Newport, Norfolk, in Hemsby
Newport Hundred, Buckinghamshire, a defunct hundred
Newport Pagnell, Buckinghamshire

Scotland 
Newport, Caithness, a small hamlet
Newport-on-Tay, Fife

Wales 

Newport, Wales, a city and county borough in South Wales
District of Newport, 1974–1996 (defunct)
Newport (Monmouthshire) (UK Parliament constituency), 1918–1983
Newport, Pembrokeshire, West Wales

North America

Canada
Newport, Quebec, in Le Haut-Saint-François Regional County Municipality
Newport, Chandler, Quebec
Newport, Newfoundland and Labrador
Newport, Nova Scotia
Newport Corner, Nova Scotia
Newport Landing, Nova Scotia
Newport Station, Nova Scotia
Newport, Ontario

Jamaica
Newport, Jamaica, the location of Bethabara Moravian Church

United States 

Newport, Arkansas
Newport, California
Newport Beach, California
Newport Coast, Newport Beach, California
Newport, Delaware
Newport, Florida (disambiguation)
Newport, Georgia, see List of places in Georgia (U.S. state) (I–R)
Newport, Illinois
Newport, Indiana
Newport, Iowa, see Muscatine, Iowa micropolitan area#Unincorporated places
Fountain City, Indiana, originally named "Newport"
Newport, Kentucky
Newport, Maine, a New England town
Newport (CDP), Maine, the main village in the town
Newport, Charles County, Maryland
Newport, Michigan
Newport, Minnesota
Newport, Mississippi, see Mississippi Highway 3
Newport, Missouri
Newport, Nebraska
Newport, New Hampshire, a New England town
Newport (CDP), New Hampshire, the main village in the town
Newport, New Jersey (disambiguation)
Newport, New York, a town
Newport (village), New York, within the town of Newport
Newport, North Carolina
Newport, Ohio (disambiguation)
Newport, Oklahoma
Newport, Oregon
Newport, Pennsylvania, in Perry County
Newport, Lawrence County, Pennsylvania, see List of places in Pennsylvania: N
Newport Creek, a tributary of the Susquehanna River in Luzerne County, Pennsylvania
Newport, Rhode Island
Newport County, Rhode Island
Newport, South Carolina
Newport, Tennessee
Newport, Texas
Newport (city), Vermont
Newport (town), Vermont, surrounding the city of Newport
Newport, Virginia (disambiguation)
Newport News, Virginia
Newport, Washington
Newport, Bellevue, Washington
Newport, West Virginia
Newport, Wisconsin

Oceania

Australia
Newport, New South Wales
Newport, Queensland
New Port, South Australia
Newport, Victoria

New Zealand
Opua, originally named Newport

People

Persons with the surname, Newport
Andrew Newport, 17th-century English Tory politician, courtier and royalist
Andrew Newport (died 1611), English politician
Cal Newport (1982–) American non-fiction author and associate professor of computer science
Christopher Newport, late 16th-century English seaman and privateer
Elissa L. Newport, professor of neurology at Georgetown University
Sister Esther Newport (1901–1986), American painter, sculptor and art educator who founded the Catholic Art Association
Francis Newport (fl. 1559), English politician
Francis Newport (died 1623), English politician
Francis Newport, 1st Earl of Bradford, late 17th-century English soldier, courtier and Whig politician
George Newport, 19th-century English entomologist
George Newport (cricketer), played first-class cricket for Somerset in 1902 and 1904
Henry Newport, 3rd Earl of Bradford (1683–1734), 18th-century English peer and Whig politician
Sir John Newport, 1st Baronet, Anglo-Irish politician
Phil Newport, former English cricketer
Richard Newport (bishop) (died 1318), English Bishop of London
Richard Newport (died 1570), MP for Shropshire
Richard Newport, 1st Baron Newport (1587–1651), English peer, MP for Shropshire in 1614, 1624–1629 and for Shrewsbury
Richard Newport, 2nd Earl of Bradford (1644–1723), English peer and MP for Shropshire 1670–1685 and 1689–1698
Richard Newport (MP) (1685–1716), English MP for (Much) Wenlock and son of the 2nd Earl of Bradford
Richard Spicer alias Newport (died c. 1435), MP for Portsmouth
Stephen Newport, Australian rules footballer
Thomas Newport, 1st Baron Torrington (c. 1655 – 1719), English MP for Ludlow, Winchelse, (Much) Wenlock and Teller of the Exchequer
Thomas Newport, 4th Earl of Bradford (c. 1696 – 1762), English peer
Newport, a slave and later freed servant to Ezra Stiles

Architecture, buildings, structures 
Camp Newport, a Salvation Army camp in Muskoka, Ontario, Canada
Newport (HBLR station), Jersey City, New Jersey, United States
Newport Aquarium, an aquarium in Newport, Kentucky
Newport Parish Church, former name of St. Luke's Church (Smithfield, Virginia), a historical church in Isle of Wight County, Virginia
Newport Tower (Jersey City), the third tallest building in Jersey City, New Jersey
Newport Tower (Rhode Island), round stone tower located in Touro Park in Newport, Rhode Island
Rock Island Swing Bridge, also known as the Newport Rail Bridge, an old swing bridge spanning the Mississippi River in Minnesota
Shrewsbury and Newport Canal, a former canal in Shropshire, England, awaiting restoration

Educational institutions
 Newport High School (disambiguation), various secondary schools
 Christopher Newport University
 University of Wales, Newport

Fictional places 
New Port City, fictional megacities where Ghost in the Shell and Dominion, two manga series by Masamune Shirow, are mostly set
Newport, fictional city on the west coast of North America in The Longest Journey and Dreamfall
New Port, a fictional city where superheroes have been outlawed by its criminal ruler, Bomb Queen, in the Image Comics universe
Newport, California, where the popular TV series The O.C. takes place (loosely based on the non-fictional Orange County, California city of Newport Beach)

Music 
Newport Jazz Festival, in Newport, Rhode Island, also referred to sometimes as simply Newport, especially in the titles of some recordings of performers at the festival
Newport Folk Festival, in Newport, Rhode Island, sometimes referred to as simply Newport
"Newport Living" (song), by the American power pop band Cute Is What We Aim For
Newport Music Hall, a music venue located in Columbus, Ohio
Music of Newport, in Wales, noted for 1980s and 1990s indie acts and venues

Sport 
Newport City F.C.
Newport County A.F.C.
 Newport Gwent Dragons, a former name of Dragons RFC, a Welsh rugby union team
Newport HSOB RFC
Newport International Sports Village
Newport (IOW) F.C.
Newport Nocturne
Newport (Salop) Rugby Union Football Club
Newport Saracens RFC
Newport RFC
Newport Wasps

Transport 
Newport Bus, bus services
Newport station (disambiguation), railway and bus stations
Chrysler Newport, a vehicle manufactured by the Chrysler Corporation from 1961–1981
Nieuport, French airplane manufacturer

Watercraft 
Newport Ship, known as the Newport Medieval Ship
Newport (steamboat), American steamboat built in 1908
, U.S. navy tank landing ship in commission from 1969 to 1992
, more than one U.S. navy ship
HMS Newport, more than one Royal Navy ship
Newport 20, an American sailboat design
Newport 30, an American sailboat design
Newport 31, an American sailboat design
Newport 33, an American sailboat design

Other uses 
Newport (cigarette), cigarette brand produced by the R. J. Reynolds Tobacco Company
Newport (Martian crater), on Mars
Newport (Worship Team), a contemporary Christian and worship team from Orange County, California, United States
Newport (Ymerodraeth State of Mind), a parody of the Jay-Z and Alicia Keys song "Empire State of Mind,"
The Newport Rising, the last large-scale armed rebellion against authority in mainland Britain, in 1839
Newport Show, an agricultural show in Shropshire, England
Newport Television, a media conglomerate

See also 

 Newport Center (disambiguation)
 Newport Township (disambiguation), places in the United States
 Newport East (disambiguation), Welsh electoral divisions and a US area
 Newport West (disambiguation), Welsh station and electoral divisions
 Nieuwpoort (disambiguation), places in the Low Countries of Europe
Nieuwpoort, Belgium, a city and municipality in Belgium
Nieuwpoort, South Holland, a city in the Netherlands
Nowy Port, a district of Gdańsk, Poland
 
 Old Port (disambiguation)
 Port (disambiguation)
 New (disambiguation)